

Ka 
Kakanj, Kalac, Kale, Kalesija, Kalađurđevići (municipality Ravno), Kamen, Kanlići, Kanjina, Karauzovići, Karovići, Kašići, Kazagići

Ki 
Kijev Do (municipality Ravno)

Kl 
Klepci

Knj 
Knjevići

Ko 
Kodžaga Polje, Kola, Kolakovići, Kolijevke, Kolovarice, Komanje Brdo (municipality Stolac(BiH)), Konjbaba, Konjevići, Konjic (Herzegovina-Neretva Canton), Kosne Luke, Kopači, Kosače, Kostajnica, Kostenik, Koto, Kovači, Kozice (municipality Stolac(BiH))

Kr 
Kraboriš, Krajkovići, Kralupi, Krašići, Kreča, Krehin Gradac, Krstac, Krtići, Krućevići, Krupac, Krušćica, Kruševo (municipality Stolac)

Ku 
Kučine, Kula, Kušeši, Kutina (municipality Ravno), Kutješi

Lists of settlements in the Federation of Bosnia and Herzegovina (A-Ž)